Pudur is a village in the Annavasalrevenue block of Pudukkottai district, Tamil Nadu, India.

Demographics 

 census, Pudur had a total population of 2525 with 1221 males and 1304 females. Out of the total population 1128    people were literate.

References

Villages in Pudukkottai district